King of Clubs was an adult reality series aired on Playboy TV that ended in May 2009. It revolved around the Gentile family and their operation of Las Vegas' historic Palomino Strip Club.

Premise
The show premise is based upon the real business operations of Nevada attorney Dominic Gentile. In 2006, he purchased the Palomino Club to cover legal fees from former owner Luis Hidalgo III. Since the acquisition, Gentile's son Adam has overseen daily operations and his ex-wife, Michelle, has managed the accounting.

Originally featured on Gene Simmons Family Jewels, producers felt the story and club staff would make for a compelling reality series on its own. Though much too risque for A&E, the show was pitched to and picked up by Playboy TV in late 2008. Premiering in September 2009, King of Clubs will carry a humorous tone and be primarily focused on Adam Gentile's continuous struggle to manage his best friend bartender, out-of-control bouncers, and unpredictable staff of exotic dancers.  The show is produced by The Greif Company, executive produced and directed by David Roma, and created and executive produced by  Leslie Greif and Adam Reed. According to her Twitter account, former child actress and member of the original cast of the children's sketch show All That, Katrina Johnson has appeared on a few episodes. Johnson is a bartender at the club featured in the show.

Episode Guide

Season 1

References

External links
King Of Clubs Official Site

Palomino Las Vegas Web Site

2000s American reality television series
2009 American television series debuts
2009 American television series endings
Television series by Playboy Enterprises
Playboy TV original programming